Ben Lyon (February 6, 1901 – March 22, 1979) was an American film actor and a studio executive at 20th Century-Fox who later acted in British radio, films and TV.

Early life and career

Lyon was born in Atlanta, Georgia, the son of Alvine W. (Wiseberg) and Ben Lyon, a travelling salesman. His family was Jewish. Lyon entered films in 1918 after a successful appearance on Broadway opposite Jeanne Eagels. He attracted attention in the highly successful film Flaming Youth (1923) and steadily developed into a leading man. He was successfully paired with some of the leading actresses of the silent era, including Pola Negri, Gloria Swanson, Colleen Moore, Barbara La Marr, Viola Dana, Anna Q. Nilsson, Mary Astor and Blanche Sweet. In 1925, a writer for Photoplay wrote of him, "Girls, Ben Lyon looks harmless but we have reliable information that he's irresistible, so watch your step. Besides he's a mighty fine actor and if the ladies must fall in love with him he can't help it."

He had success as an actor in the 1930 film Hell's Angels. The film was a major success and brought Jean Harlow to prominence, but Lyon's performance as a heroic World War I aviator was also highly regarded. For the next decade he was constantly in demand, but his popularity began to wane by the early 1940s. By the mid 1940s he was working for 20th Century-Fox. On July 17, 1946, he met a young aspiring actress named Norma Jeane Dougherty. After his first meeting with her, he stated that she was "Jean Harlow all over again!" He organized a color screen test for the actress, renamed her, and finally signed her as Marilyn Monroe to her first studio contract.

During World War II, when the United States was still neutral, Lyon and his wife, actress Bebe Daniels, settled in London. The couple, along with the comedian Vic Oliver, starred in the radio series Hi, Gang!, which ran from 1940 to 1949. Hi Gang was succeeded in 1950 by Life with the Lyons, which also featured their real-life son Richard and daughter Barbara, and spawned a couple of theatrical films as well as a television series on BBC and independent television from 1954 until 1960. Bebe Daniels had top billing in these series, similar to the concurrent American show starring married couple Lucille Ball and Desi Arnaz.

He was the subject of This Is Your Life in March 1963, when he was surprised by Eamonn Andrews at the BBC Television Theatre.

Military service
Lyon served as a pilot in the 322nd Pursuit Squadron in the early 1930s. During World War II he returned to the colours as a lieutenant colonel in charge of US Army Air Forces Special Services.

Personal life
Lyon married actress Bebe Daniels in June 1930. They had two children, daughter Barbara in 1932 and a son, Richard, whom they adopted from a London orphanage. In an issue of the contemporary magazine Radio Pictorial, Bebe explained how she saw Richard peering through the railings and instantly thought "A brother for Barbara". Daniels suffered a severe stroke in 1963 and withdrew from public life. She suffered a second stroke in late 1970. She died at the couple's London home in March 1971.

On April 1, 1972, Lyon married the actress Marian Nixon, whom he had known since the 1920s. They remained married until his death. She died five years later, also at age 78.

Death
On March 22, 1979, Lyon and his second wife, Marian Nixon, were vacationing together on the Queen Elizabeth 2 cruise ship near Honolulu, Hawaii, when Lyon suffered a fatal heart attack. He was 78 years old. His body was cremated and is interred in the Chapel Columbarium at Hollywood Forever Cemetery next to his first wife, Bebe Daniels.

For his contribution to the motion picture industry, Ben Lyon has a star on the Hollywood Walk of Fame at 1724 Vine Street.

A biography, Bebe and Ben, was written by Jill Allgood, a personal friend who worked with them at the BBC.

Selected filmography

Bibliography

References

External links

 
 
 Photographs of Ben Lyon and bibliography
 BBC Desert Island Discs

1901 births
1979 deaths
20th-century American male actors
Jewish American male actors
American expatriate male actors in the United Kingdom
American film studio executives
American male film actors
American male radio actors
American male silent film actors
American male stage actors
American male television actors
Burials at Hollywood Forever Cemetery
Male actors from Atlanta
20th-century American businesspeople
United States Army colonels
People who died at sea
20th-century American Jews